The 2019 Overwatch World Cup was the fourth edition of the Overwatch World Cup, an Overwatch esports tournament, organized by the game's developer Blizzard Entertainment and took place at the Anaheim Convention Center during BlizzCon from November 1–2, 2019. After qualifications, ten team competed in the group stages, with six team advancing to the knockout round.

The final took place on November 2 between the United States and China. The United States won the match 3–0 to claim their first World Cup title, marking the first time that the title was won by a team other than South Korea.

Teams

Committees 
Each country has a National Competition Committee, consisting of a general manager, head coach, and community lead. The entire committee will be selected by fans through a two-step voting process. The first phase took place from May 15 to May 24, where any individuals was able to share a custom link for fans to vote for them. From  May 30 to June 9, the top candidates from the first phase entered a runoff for their respective country. Any person with an active Battle.net account was able to vote for who they wanted see as their country's general manager and community lead, and Overwatch players with a high enough skill rating on the competitive ladder were allowed to vote for the head coach position.

Players 
The players representing each country were selected by their National Competition Committee; player tryouts were held from July 13 to July 14. The Committees selected up to 12 players to represent their country and then had to cut it down to 7 players for their final roster.

Qualification 
Any country wishing to participate is eligible to play in the preliminary rounds, a single-elimination, seeded bracket. The top five countries based on their national ranking will not have to play in the preliminary rounds and will have any automatic bye to the group stages. A country's national ranking will be determined by a point-ranking system based on final placements in the previous World Cups; the seeding will be based on the national rankings. The top five countries from the preliminary rounds will move on to the group stages.

The single-elimination preliminary rounds for qualification took place on October 31. Twenty-eight teams competed in the preliminary rounds.

Automatically qualified (5)

Qualified (5)

Venue

Group stage 
The Group stages took place on November 1. The ten countries competing in the group stages were split evenly into two round-robin style groups. The top country from each group moved on to the semifinals, while the second- and third-placed countries in each group moved on to the quarterfinals.

Group A 

Source: OWWC

Group B 

Source: OWWC

Knockout stage 
The knockout stage took place on November 2. The six teams that moved on from the group stages participated in a single-elimination playoff. The winner of the finals was awarded a gold medal, while the loser was awarded silver. The two teams that lost in their respective semifinals match played each other for the bronze medal.

Bracket

Quarterfinals

Semifinals

Third place

Finals

References

External links 
 Official website

Overwatch
Overwatch World Cup
Overwatch
Overwatch World Cup